Wallace Hampton Tucker is an American  astrophysicist who specializes in high-energy astrophysics, 
an award-winning playwright, and an active environmentalist.

Early life
Tucker was born in McAlester, Oklahoma. He’s a part of the Choctaw tribe. He attended and graduated from McAlester High School where he met his future wife, Karen. Shortly after their graduation, they eloped.

Education
Tucker attended the University of Oklahoma and where he earned his bachelor's degree in mathematics and Master's in physics. He continued his education from there and received his Ph.D. in physics from the University of California, San Diego in 1966.

He has been active in environmental work, helping to found and lead two nonprofit organizations in Southern California: the Fallbrook Land Conservancy (FLC) and the San Diego Land Conservation Coalition. The FLC was formed in 1988. It has acquired and manages over 1850 acres of open space on 10 preserves throughout San Diego County.  These preserves offer a safe haven for wildlife and native plant species.

Plays
His plays reflect his Native American heritage, focusing on the struggles of mixed and full-blood Indians to come to terms with both the Indian and the white cultures:
 Miccos War
 At the Sweet Gum Bridge: A Play About Pushamataha
 Fire on Bending Mountain
 Where Echo Calls

References

Year of birth missing (living people)
Living people
20th-century American physicists
21st-century American physicists
20th-century Native Americans
American astrophysicists
Choctaw people
Native American environmentalists
Native American scientists
21st-century Native Americans